My Love Sinema,  is a 2016 Singaporean drama film directed by Tan Ai Leng. The film is set in the 1950s, and later transitions to modern day.

Plot
Twenty-year-old Kheong moves from a Malay kampung to Singapore to train as a film projectionist. There, he meets Wei, a young Chinese teacher and a leftist radical. He soon falls in love with her.

Cast
 Tosh Zhang as Kheong
 Cheryl Wee as Wei
 Jeff Wang as Brother Lee
 Zen Chong
 Nora Miao
 Cherry Ngan

Release
The film was originally meant to be released on 29 August 2016. The film released in theatres in Singapore on 8 September. It was also screened in Japan on 8 September. The film was released in theatres in Japan on 8 September.

Reception
John Lui of The Straits Times rated the film two-and-a-half stars out of five, praising the part of the film set in the 1950s, while criticising the third act, writing "In a third-act blunder, the movie lurches forward in time to a mind-numbingly hysterical set of events in the present day, filled with silly coincidences and overstuffed bits in which as many actors as possible say as many lines as possible." Luo Yingling rated the film two stars out of five, criticising the acting.

References

External links
 

2016 films
Singaporean drama films